Lepidocephalichthys guntea, the Guntea loach, scavenger loach or peppered loach, is a species of cobitid loach native to southern and southeastern Asia.  This species reaches a length of  TL. It uses its intestines to breathe, which gives it the ability to adapt to live in a variety of stagnant and flowing environments. This fish is found in the aquarium trade.

References

See also 

 
 

Cobitidae
Taxa named by Francis Buchanan-Hamilton
Fish described in 1822